Icrave (styled ICRAVE) is an innovation and design studio founded in 2002 by Canadian-born designer Lionel Ohayon. Conceived as a design/build company, the studio's projects were predominantly in nightlife sector, including lounges and clubs in Manhattan, Los Angeles and Las Vegas. The studio's nightlife work has contributed to the gentrification and popularization of New York City's Meatpacking District.

Over the past decade, the studio has designed hospitality spaces, including restaurants, bars, casinos, and hotels. Working with The One Group, ICRAVE developed the STK steakhouse brand with 7 locations across the US. The steakhouse brand went public in 2015. The firm is now developing STK's sister brand, STK Rebel. The first location will open in Miami in 2016.

In 2008, the studio designed JetBlue Terminal 5 at John F. Kennedy International Airport in New York, incorporating technology into the gate hold areas and dining spaces. Touch screen monitors expedited food service, reduce passenger anxiety, and monetized previously underutilized gate hold areas. Today, their roster of airport work spans dozens of venues across North America.

The studio's capabilities have evolved to include brand strategy, product design, and graphic design. The studio has been tasked to create identities and collateral  for client projects ranging from logos to marketing materials to staff uniforms. In 2012, Icrave established an in-house lighting department, Icrave Lighting (styled ICRAVE LIGHTING), to consult across all projects.

In recent years, Icrave's project roster has expanded to new sectors including healthcare, higher education, and residential developments. For the past two years, Icrave has been working with Memorial Sloan Kettering on two ambulatory care centers in New York's Upper East Side. The Josie Robertson Surgery Center is slated to open in early 2016.

Icrave's work has been recognized with numerous industry accolades from Architizer, Travel + Leisure, Frommer's, Fodor's, International Design, International Interior Design, Hospitality Design, Restaurant & Bar Design, and Hamptons Cottages and Gardens.

Notable projects 
 John F. Kennedy International Airport, JetBlue Terminal 5
 LaGuardia Airport, Delta Terminal C
 LaGuardia Airport, Delta Terminal D
 Toronto Pearson International Airport, various venues
 Josie Robertson Surgery Center at Memorial Sloan Kettering
 STK, Meatpacking District NYC
 STK, Midtown NYC
 STK, Los Angeles
 STK, Las Vegas
 STK, Chicago
 Catch Restaurant, NYC
 Le District, NYC
 Ocean Prime, Beverly Hills
 Ocean Prime, NYC
 Sushi Samba, Las Vegas 
 Provocateur, NYC
 Marquee Nightclub, Sydney
 W Hotels, Atlanta Midtown
 Sir Adam Hotel, Amsterdam
 Hotel Gansevoort Lobby, Meatpacking District NYC
 Regent Seven Seas Explorer

External links 
 Icrave
 Icrave Facebook

References 

Branding companies of the United States
Companies based in New York City